Hortia is a genus of plants in family Rutaceae, with 10 species native to Central America and northern South America.

Species
Species include:
Hortia arborea Engl.
Hortia brasiliana Vand. ex DC.
Hortia coccinea Spruce ex Engl.
Hortia excelsa Ducke
Hortia longifolia Benth. ex Engl.
Hortia neblinensis Maguire & B.M.Boom
Hortia nudipetala Groppo
Hortia oreadica Groppo, Kallunki & Pirani
Hortia regia Sandwith — bush orange
Hortia superba Ducke
Hortia vandelliana Groppo

References

Zanthoxyloideae
Zanthoxyloideae genera